Prithvi (Sanskrit: पृथ्वी, also पृथिवी, "the Vast One"), also rendered Prithvi Mata, is the Sanskrit name for the earth, as well as the name of a devi (goddess) in Hinduism and some branches of Buddhism. In the Vedas, her consort is Dyaus, the sky god. Her Puranic equivalent is known as Bhumi, the consort of Varaha.

As Pṛthvī Mātā ('Mother Earth') she is complementary to Dyaus Pita ('Father Sky'). In the Rigveda, the earth and the sky are primarily addressed dually as Dyavapṛthivi. She is associated with the cow; Prithu, an incarnation of Vishnu, milked her in the form of a cow.

Owing to strong historical Hindu influence, the name is also used for national personifications of Indonesia, where she is referred to as Ibu Pertiwi.

Buddhism
In Buddhist texts and visual representations, Pṛthvī is described as both protecting Gautama Buddha and as being his witness for his enlightenment. Prithvi appears in Early Buddhism in the Pāli Canon, dispelling the temptation figure Mara by attesting to Gautama Buddha's worthiness to attain enlightenment. The Buddha is frequently depicted performing the bhūmisparśa or "earth-touching" mudrā as a symbolic invocation of the goddess. 

In Chinese Buddhism, she is considered one of the Twenty-Four Protective Deities (二十四諸天 Èrshísì zhūtiān) and is usually enshrined in the Mahavira Hall of Buddhist temples along with the other devas.

Pṛthvī Sūkta
The  (or ) is a hymn of the Atharvaveda (12.1).

Epithets

See also

Vasudhara
Phra Mae Thorani

References

Further reading

 Dictionary of Hindu Lore and Legend by Anna Dallapiccola
 Hindu Goddesses: Vision of the Divine Feminine in the Hindu Religious Traditions by David Kinsley

Classical elements
Earth goddesses
Hindu goddesses
Mother goddesses
Rigvedic deities
Locations in Hindu mythology
Hindu cosmology